Mary Burns or John Burns was an American woman who disguised herself as a man in order to fight in the American Civil War.
She enlisted in the 7th Michigan Volunteer Cavalry Regiment in order not to be parted from her lover, who was in the same regiment.
Her sex was discovered ten days after being recognized by an acquaintance, before her company had left Detroit.

She was arrested in uniform, held in the city jail, charged with masquerading as a man, and sent home. The account of the incident in the Detroit Advertiser and Tribune (February 25, 1863) described the defendant as "a very pretty woman".

See also 
 List of female American Civil War soldiers

References 

Female wartime cross-dressers in the American Civil War
Michigan Brigade
Year of birth missing
Year of death missing
Women soldiers
19th-century American women
People from Michigan